Middleton House is a grade II* listed building on Monkgate, immediately east of the city centre of York in England.

The house was built in about 1700.  It may have been constructed for Benjamin West, who is known to have owned two of the neighbouring plots.  Originally, the house was two storeys high, five bays wide at the front, and had an "L"-shaped plan.  In about 1770, the space between Middleton House and 40 Monkgate was filled when a carriage arch was constructed, with two rooms above.  These originally formed part of 40 Monkgate, but are now part of Middleton House.  Around the same time, a third storey was added to Middleton House.

In 1798, the Unitarian minister Charles Wellbeloved bought the house.  In 1803, he consented to become the principal of Manchester College, on the condition that it was relocated to York.  This was agreed, and it was accommodated in Middleton House until 1811.  In order to increase the space for the academy, the north ground floor room was extended, new rooms were added at the rear of the building, and a new carriage arch was constructed.  In the 20th century, the carriage arch was filled in, with another room added.

The building is constructed of brick.  Original sash windows survive on the ground floor.  Inside, the decoration of the north ground floor room dates from the early 19th century, with the fireplace surround and cupboards being by John Wolstenholme.  Most of the staircase is original, although the balusters of the bottom flight were changed in the early 18th century.  One of the rooms over the carriageway has a mid-18th century fireplace surround, and two other rooms have firegrates made by Carron in about 1803.

The house was purchased by the York Conservation Trust in 1990, who converted it into apartments and renovated the building.

References

Buildings and structures completed in 1700
Grade II* listed buildings in York